Mũi Né is a coastal fishing town in the south-central Bình Thuan Province of Vietnam.  The town, with approximately 25,000 residents, is a ward of the city of Phan Thiết. Mui Ne and the other wards of Phan Thiet stretch along the coast for approximately 50 kilometers and have been transformed into a resort destination since the mid 1990s, when many visited the area to view the solar eclipse of October 24, 1995. Most notably, tourism has developed in the area from the Phan Thiet city center to Mui Ne, which has more than a hundred beach resorts, as well as restaurants, bars, shops and cafes.

Mũi Né ward has two beaches; Ganh Beach and Suoi Nuoc Beach, both with a number of resorts and a few shops and restaurants. But the most highly developed area is Rang Beach in Ham Tien ward (often erroneously called "Mui Ne Beach" by foreigners), which extends west of Mui Ne.

The tourist season is from December to April. The average temperature is 27°C, and the climate is hot and dry much of the year.

Mui Ne is well known for unique white sand dunes, featuring several lakes and even swamps straight in the middle of sandy terrain.

Culture

Cuisine 
Mui Ne is famous for seafood. Sand dunes are inhabited by the iguana, called Dong in Vietnamese. It is a reptile, quite similar to the lizard, but larger and longer. Local people cook iguana in seven ways: grilled, steamed, fried, roasted, raw, served in porridge, iguana pie, and served alongside vegetables. Therefore, the local people call this the seven dishes from iguana.

Gallery

References

External links

Communes of Binh Thuan province
Populated places in Bình Thuận province
Fishing communities in Vietnam